J. L. Langley is the pen name of an American writer of over a dozen gay romance novels, some of which have been translated into Spanish, Japanese and German.

Bibliography

Novels

Sci-Regency Series 
 My Fair Captain (Samhain Publishing, 2007 & Dreamspinner Press, 2018)
 The Englor Affair (Samhain Publishing, 2008 & Dreamspinner Press, 2018)
 My Regelence Rake (Samhain Publishing, 2012 & Dreamspinner Press, 2018)
 Diplomatic Relations (Dreamspinner Press, 2019)
 My Highland Laird (Dreamspinner Press, 2020)

With or Without Series 
 With Love                   (Rewritten and extended into a novella)
 Without Reservations        (Re-Published)
 With Caution                (Re-Published)
 With Abandon                (Re-Published)
 Without Secrets             (Never released)

Ranch Series 
 The Tin Star
 The Broken H
 The Christmas Tree Bargain

Innamorati Series 
 His Convenient Husband

References

External links
 J. L. Langley's Official Web Site
 J. L. Langley's Yahoo! group

21st-century American novelists
American romantic fiction writers
Living people
Year of birth missing (living people)